Cameron Bancroft (born 1992) is an Australian Test cricketer.

Cameron Bancroft may also refer to:

 Cameron Bancroft (actor) (born 1967), Canadian actor